Shortt is a surname. Notable people with the surname include:

Adam Shortt (1859–1931), Canadian economic historian.
Bill Shortt (1920–2004), Welsh professional footballer.
Edward Shortt (1862–1935), British politician.
Henry Edward Shortt (1887–1987), British protozoologist.
John Shortt (1822–1889), British Indian physician, naturalist, and ethnologist
Kate Shortt, British pianist, cello player, songwriter.
Pat Shortt (born 1966), Irish comedian and entertainer.
William Hamilton Shortt (1881–1971), British engineer and horologist.
Yvonne Shortt (born 1972), American social practice installation artist.

See also
Shortt-Synchronome clock, a free pendulum clock, patented in 1921.
Polly Shortts, a hill on the outskirts in South Africa.
Short (surname), a similar surname.